Datuk Liang Teck Meng (born 24 July 1971) is a Malaysian politician and was the Member of Parliament (MP) for the Simpang Renggam constituency in the State of Johor (2008 - 2018). He was Secretary General for the Parti Gerakan Rakyat Malaysia (GERAKAN), previously a component party in the Barisan Nasional (BN) coalition (2013 - 2018).

Education and personal life
Liang Teck Meng obtain his secondary education from Foon Yew High School (1984 to 1989). He received a distinction in his SPM and after that he went to the Federal Institute of Technology to study Electrical Engineering (1989 to 1992). Later, he went to study at the Japanese language from the prestigious Asia Student Cultural Association He later went to the Tohoku University, Sendai, Japan to continue in the field of Electrical Engineering.

Liang is an engineer by profession, and is married with two sons.

Parliamentary career
Liang was elected to federal Parliament in the 2008 election, succeeding fellow Gerakan member Kerk Choo Ting in the seat of Simpang Renggam. Liang's victory was one of only two for Gerakan in the 12 federal seats it contested. He was reelected to Parliament in the 2013 election as the only successful GERAKAN candidate, and remained the only Gerakan MP until Mah Siew Keong won the 2014 Telok Intan by-election. However Liang have lost in the 2018 election. 23 June 2018, Liang, Mah Siew Keong and among all leaders have unanimously decided GERAKAN to officially withdraw from BN and now independent party as opposition.

Election results

Honours
  :
  Commander of the Order of Meritorious Service (PJN) - Datuk (2014)

See also

Simpang Renggam (federal constituency)

References

Living people
1971 births
People from Johor
Malaysian politicians of Chinese descent
Malaysian engineers
Parti Gerakan Rakyat Malaysia politicians
Members of the Dewan Rakyat
Tohoku University alumni
21st-century Malaysian politicians
Commanders of the Order of Meritorious Service